The 2020 LPGA Tour was the 71st edition of the LPGA Tour, a series of professional golf tournaments for elite female golfers from around the world. The season began at the Four Season Golf Club in Lake Buena Vista, Florida on January 16 and ended on December 20 at the Tiburón Golf Club in Naples, Florida. The tournaments were sanctioned by the United States-based Ladies Professional Golf Association (LPGA).

Schedule and results
The number in parentheses after each winners' name is the player's total number of wins in official money individual events on the LPGA Tour, including that event. Tournament and winner names in bold indicate LPGA majors.

Several events were postponed or canceled due to the coronavirus pandemic.

Key

Unofficial events
The following event appears on the schedule, but does not carry official money.

Statistics leaders

Money list leaders

Source and complete list: LPGA official website.

Scoring average

Source and complete list: LPGA official website.

Awards

See also
2020 Ladies European Tour
2020 Symetra Tour

References

LPGA Tour seasons
LPGA Tour
LPGA Tour